Yulia Ivanova (Russian: Юлия Иванова) (born 1983, Novosibirsk) is a Russian beauty queen and a model. She was crowned Krasa Rossii in 2005 and later represented Russia at Miss World 2005.  She made the top 15 by winning the Beach Beauty competition.   Before competing in beauty pageants Yulia was a contestant in Ty - supermodel cycle 2 TV show & participated in Krasa Rossii 2004.

References

1983 births
Miss World 2005 delegates
Living people
Russian female models
Top Model contestants
Russian beauty pageant winners